Roderick William (Rod) Boswell AM FAA FTSE (born 1933 in `Yackandandah) is an Australian physicist. He is a professor at the Australian National University in Canberra, in the Space Plasma, Power and Propulsion group of the Plasma Research Laboratory. He invented a technology which become the basis for the development of a new type of rocket thruster, the Helicon Double Layer Thruster: the ongoing development of the Australian Plasma Thruster is supported by the European Space Agency.

After taking his B.Sc. at the University of Adelaide, he completed a Ph.D. at Flinders University. His graduate studies were undertaken at Flinders University, in South Australia where, in 1969, he was instrumental in establishing the radical student newspaper "Empire Times" by purchasing and running, in the living room of his home, an offset press, thereby liberating the new newspaper from the censorious tendencies of commercial printers.

His honours and awards include:
In 2001 he was awarded a Centenary Medal "for service to Australian society in applied physics".
In 2008 he was elected a Fellow of the Australian Academy of Science
In 2012 he was appointed a Member of the Order of Australia (AM) "for service to science in the field of plasma physics as an academic and researcher and through contributions to the international scientific community".

References

External links 
 
 

1932 births
Living people
20th-century Australian scientists
21st-century Australian scientists
Academic staff of the Australian National University
Australian physicists
Members of the Order of Australia
Fellows of the American Physical Society
Fellows of the Australian Academy of Science
Fellows of the Australian Academy of Technological Sciences and Engineering
Flinders University alumni
University of Adelaide alumni